Hurricane Dolores was a powerful and moderately damaging tropical cyclone whose remnants brought record-breaking heavy rains and strong winds to California. The seventh named storm, fourth hurricane, and third major hurricane of the record-breaking 2015 Pacific hurricane season, Dolores formed from a tropical wave on July 11. The system gradually strengthened, attaining hurricane status on July 13. Dolores rapidly intensified as it neared the Baja California peninsula, finally peaking as a Category 4 hurricane on the Saffir–Simpson scale with winds of 130 mph (215 km/h) on July 15. An eyewall replacement cycle began and cooler sea-surface temperatures rapidly weakened the hurricane, and Dolores weakened to a tropical storm two days later. On July 18, Dolores degenerated into a remnant low west of the Baja California peninsula.

The proximity of Dolores to Mexico led to tropical storm watches being issued for parts of the coastline. Those were later discontinued as Dolores began tracking westward away from land areas. Hurricane conditions were reported on Socorro Island, an island in the open Pacific owned by Mexico. Though the hurricane itself brought minimal damage to Baja California, its remnants caused major damage to some Californian cities and surrounding areas in the Southwestern United States. Heavy rain totaling up to four inches in San Diego and Los Angeles counties broke historic records. High rainfall rates caused a bridge on Interstate 10 to collapse and injure one person, and a road was washed out on California State Route 78 near the California–Arizona border. One person was killed by a lightning strike in Kern County, California. The heavy rains also caused flooding and mudslides. Three tornadoes were reported, and damage totaled more than $50 million.

Meteorological history

The possibility of tropical cyclogenesis from a tropical disturbance south of Mexico was first mentioned by the National Hurricane Center (NHC) on July 6. A westward-moving tropical wave crossed Central America and entered the Eastern Pacific on July 8. The next day, the wave spawned a weak area of low pressure while south of Guatemala. On July 10, the disturbance quickly organized, with convection, or thunderstorms, more concentrated near the center of the low. Early on July 11, satellite images showed that the disturbance was consolidating into a tropical depression. Consequently, at 12:00 UTC, the NHC declared the system Tropical Depression Five-E while located roughly 345 mi (555 km) south-southeast of Acapulco, Mexico. The depression gradually organized, developing banding features around the eastern portion of the system. Late that day, the depression attained tropical storm intensity and received the name Dolores, as a small central dense overcast developed near the low-level circulation center. Despite environmental conditions that were nearly ideal and largely favorable for strengthening, moderate northwesterly wind shear caused by an upper-level trough initially prevented much intensification. The storm slowly strengthened on July 11 while moving northwestward, several hundred miles off the coast of Southwestern Mexico. The cloud pattern of the storm grew more and more organized throughout July 12, with symmetric and organized convection over the center, signalling less impediment from the shear, though outflow remained restricted over the western portion of the system.

Dolores attained hurricane status at 21:00 UTC on July 13 as it turned westward away from the Mexican coastline, with a ragged eye developing alongside more convective banding. As wind shear northwest of the storm began relaxing, spiraling bands began developing over the western portion of the storm's center. Dolores continued to gradually organize and intensify, though dry air entrainments briefly halted intensification. However, soon afterward, at 00:00 UTC on July 15, Dolores rapidly intensified into a Category 2 hurricane, with the eye becoming more apparent on satellite imagery and very cold cloud tops developing near the center of circulation. Six hours later, Dolores peaked as a Category 4 hurricane with winds of 130 mph (215 km/h) and a minimum pressure of 946 mbar (hPa; 27.94 inHg). Dolores became the earliest occurrence of the third Category 4 hurricane in the Pacific basin, overcoming Hurricane Frank, which became a Category 4 hurricane on July 17, 1992.

The strengthening trend was short-lived, however, as the cloud tops in the eyewall began to warm soon after it achieved peak intensity. As Dolores approached Socorro Island, the cyclone underwent an eyewall replacement cycle and began to steadily weaken. After completing the cycle on July 16, Dolores exhibited annular characteristics, with a symmetric and wide eye. The NHC described the eyewall as thick and "donut-shaped". Re-strengthening did not commence, as Dolores had moved over cooler sea surface temperatures. Cloud tops briefly cooled, usually signaling the redevelopment of strong thunderstorms, but dry air had started to mix into the circulation. Throughout the early hours of July 17, Dolores's structure continued to decay, with an eye no longer apparent and convection waning. By 12:00 UTC, Dolores had deteriorated into a tropical storm, with no convection near its center. With increasing northerly shear, the system eventually degenerated into a post-tropical remnant low about 300 mi (480 km) west of the Baja California coast on July 18. The remnant low slowly curved southward, before dissipating on July 22, a few hundred miles west of San Diego, California.

Preparations and impact

Mexico

Due to the threat of tropical storm-force winds reaching the coast, Tropical Storm Watches were issued by the Government of Mexico for parts of the southwestern coast of the country, from Lázaro Cárdenas to Cabo Corrientes. These watches were discontinued on July 13 when Dolores pulled out to sea. Rainbands occasionally reached the coast of Mexico, causing some heavy rain. However, rainfall amounts were lower on the Baja California Peninsula, where only  of rain fell.

As the eye of Dolores passed just northeast of Socorro Island, an automated weather station on the island recorded sustained hurricane-force winds. The station reported 1-minute sustained winds of 79 mph (128 km/h), with a wind gust of 115 mph (185 km/h).

United States

As a tropical cyclone, Dolores produced no impacts in the United States. However, a surge of moisture associated with the remnants of the cyclone moved northward ahead of a trough off the Californian coast between July 17 and 18. The interaction of the moisture with the trough brought record–breaking rainfall and heavy thunderstorms to Southern California, including major cities such as San Diego and Los Angeles. In the foothills and mountains of east San Diego County, rainfall exceeded . This rain assisted firefighters in containing the North Fire, but also resulted in debris flows and rock slides that damaged about 90 homes and submerged cars. The San Diego River reached levels of —just below flood stage—and overflowed its banks in a few areas.

Flash flooding occurred in Moreno Valley, Perris, and La Mesa, while a microburst occurred in Tierrasanta. A haboob was also recorded in Anza-Borrego Desert State Park. The Los Angeles Angels game against the Boston Red Sox on July 19 was rained out, marking the first occurrence of an Angels game being rained out since 1995. The San Diego Padres also postponed their baseball game against the Colorado Rockies, their first ever rainout in July.  Strong winds blew over a semi truck as well as power poles and lines on Interstate 40 near the California-Nevada border, obstructing the road in both directions and causing $75,000 in damage. Three EF0 tornadoes were also reported, including one in San Bernardino County and another in Lassen County, although they produced no damage. In Kern County, a 62-year-old man was killed by a lightning strike. A bridge along Interstate 10 near Desert Center was washed out, injuring one; damage to the bridge was placed at $50 million. Urban flooding in the Moreno Valley caused more than $100,000. In Reche Canyon, residents were unable to leave their homes due to flooded roadways. Portions of California Highway 60 were also impassable. A portion of State Route 78 southwest of Cibola was washed out, with damage totaling $50,000. Hail the size of golf balls was recorded in Bear Valley, Alpine County, damaging a police vehicle. Overall, losses across California reached more than $50 million.

See also

 Weather of 2015
 Tropical cyclones in 2015
 List of Category 4 Pacific hurricanes
 Other storms with the same name
 List of Arizona hurricanes
 List of California hurricanes
 Hurricane Kathleen (1976) – Caused flooding in much of the Southwestern United States
 Hurricane Doreen (1977) – Affected much of the Southern California as a tropical depression, with heavy rain.
 Hurricane Ismael (1983) – Affected much of the Southern California as a remnant low with heavy rain.
 Hurricane Darby (1992) – Remnants brought record heavy rain and fog in Southern California.
 Hurricane Nora (1997) – Affected much of the Southwestern United States with heavy rain and flooding.
 Hurricane Linda (2015) – Occurred 2 months after Dolores, and also brought heavy rain to Southern California
 Hurricane Genevieve (2020) – Took an identical track and its remnants brought heavy rain to southern California.

References

External links

The National Hurricane Center's Advisory archive on Hurricane Dolores

Tropical cyclones in 2015
Hurricanes in California
Hurricanes in Arizona
Pacific hurricanes in Mexico
2015 Pacific hurricane season